The Hunterdon County Arboretum, covering , is an arboretum located at 1020 Route 31 in Lebanon, New Jersey, United States. It is the headquarters of Hunterdon County's park system, and open to the public daily without charge.

The arboretum began as a commercial nursery in 1953, growing both native and exotic trees. In 1974 the site was acquired by the Park Department.

See also 
 List of botanical gardens in the United States

External links

Arboreta in New Jersey
Botanical gardens in New Jersey
Lebanon, New Jersey
Protected areas of Hunterdon County, New Jersey